Sigmoria nigrimontis is a species of flat-backed millipede in the family Xystodesmidae. It is found in North America.

Subspecies
These four subspecies belong to the species Sigmoria nigrimontis:
 Sigmoria nigrimontis angulosa Shelley, 1981 i c g
 Sigmoria nigrimontis intermedia (Hoffman, 1948) i c g
 Sigmoria nigrimontis nigrimontis (Chamberlin, 1947) i c g
 Sigmoria nigrimontis unicoi Shelley, 1981 i c g
Data sources: i = ITIS, c = Catalogue of Life, g = GBIF, b = Bugguide.net

References

Further reading

 

Polydesmida
Millipedes of North America
Articles created by Qbugbot
Animals described in 1947